The Children's Food Trust (formerly known as the School Food Trust, renamed in 2012) was a charity in the United Kingdom that sought to promote healthy eating for children.

History
The Trust - originally named the School Food Trust - was created as a non-departmental public body in 2005 by the Department for Education and Skills (DfES), following celebrity chef Jamie Oliver's critique of the nutritional quality of school meals in his TV documentary Jamie's School Dinners and the recommendations of the School Meals Review Panel. It had been found that standards of school meals in England were low, with the average ingredient spent per meal before 2005 at secondary schools being around 40p. Childhood obesity is a growing problem in the UK in specific demographic groups, with some medical professionals predicting that today's youngsters will have a lower life expectancy than their parents, with problems with Type 2 diabetes and heart disease.

Suzi Leather was appointed as Chair of the Trust and Judy Hargadon, an NHS senior manager, was appointed as the Trust's first Chief Executive. Leather resigned in 2006 to become Chair of the Charity Commission and, in November of that year, Prue Leith was named as the Chair. She retired in January 2010. Hargadon retired in 2013 and was succeeded by Linda Cregan.

In April 2007, the Trust also became a registered charity. In October 2011, the Trust officially ceased to be an NDPB, expanding its work both as a charity and by trading its services through a new community interest company, the Children's Food Trust.

In July 2017, the charity's closure was announced due to running out of funding and the charity was officially closed on 30 September 2017.

Funding
The trust was initially funded by a £15 million grant from the Department for Education and Skills and has been awarded in partnership with several organizations, including The Prince's Trust, Business in the Community, Magic Outcomes, and the Improvement Foundation. The Trust has also received an additional £20 million funding from the Big Lottery Fund for a network of school children's cookery clubs called Let's Get Cooking.

References

External links
 Children's Food Trust website 

Educational charities based in the United Kingdom
Health education in the United Kingdom
Private companies limited by guarantee of the United Kingdom
Organizations established in 2005
Charities based in Sheffield
British food and drink organisations
2005 establishments in the United Kingdom
Children's health-related organizations
Education in Sheffield
Government-provided school meals in the United Kingdom